Phon Phisai is a district (amphoe) in Nong Khai province, northeastern Thailand.

History
The district was originally part of Mueang Phon Phaeng, now part of Rattanawapi district. In 1906 it was established as a district.

Geography
Neighboring districts are (from the east clockwise) Rattanawapi and Fao Rai of Nong Khai Province; Ban Dung, Sang Khom, and Phen of Udon Thani province; and Mueang Nong Khai of Nong Khai. To the north across the Mekong River are the Laotian Vientiane Prefecture and Bolikhamxai province.

Administration
The district is divided into 11 sub-districts (tambons), which are further subdivided into 151 villages (mubans). Chumphon is a sub-district municipality (thesaban tambon) which covers parts of tambon Chumphon. There are a further 11 tambon administrative organizations (TAO).

Missing numbers are tambon which now form the districts Fao Rai and Rattanawapi.

References

External links
amphoe.com (Thai)

Phon Phisai